James Hargreaves (13 August 1868 – 11 October 1924) was a New Zealand cricketer. He played in one first-class match for Canterbury in 1886/87.

See also
 List of Canterbury representative cricketers

References

External links
 

1868 births
1924 deaths
New Zealand cricketers
Canterbury cricketers
Cricketers from Christchurch